Gerald W. Clusen is a retired Rear Admiral in the United States Navy.

Biography
A native of Manitowoc, Wisconsin, Clusen graduated from the University of Wisconsin-La Crosse with a B.S. in computer science with a minor in mathematics. In civilian life, Clusen worked for Kimberly-Clark for more than 28 years.

Career
Clusen originally enlisted in the United States Navy Reserve in 1971. Commissioned as an officer in 1983, he was assigned to the Naval Security Group. In October 2010, he was named Reserve Deputy Commander of the United States Tenth Fleet.

Awards he has received include the Meritorious Service Medal with award star, the Navy Commendation Medal, and the Navy Achievement Medal with two award stars.

References

Living people
People from Manitowoc, Wisconsin
Military personnel from Wisconsin
United States Navy rear admirals
United States Navy personnel of the Vietnam War
University of Wisconsin–La Crosse alumni
Year of birth missing (living people)